The Ningo-Prampram Constituency is one of the constituencies represented in the Parliament of Ghana. The constituency derives its name from the two towns located within the constituency. The towns are the much larger and older Ningo and the relatively younger Prampram which is much smaller. It elects one Member of Parliament (MP) by the first past the post system of election. Ningo-Prampram  is located in the Ningo-Prampram District of the Greater Accra Region of Ghana.  Central University College has a campus at Miotso near Prampram and plans are underway to relocate its other campuses to Ningo-Prampram. Hope City which was initially planned to be built at Kasoa has also been relocated here. Plans are also underway to build the new international airport at a location near Ningo.

Members of Parliament

Elections

See also
List of Ghana Parliament constituencies
Parliamentary constituencies in the Greater Accra Region

References 

Parliamentary constituencies in the Greater Accra Region